Louise Dorothy Ritter (born February 18, 1958) is an American former track and field athlete who won the gold medal in the high jump at the 1988 Olympic Games.

Biography
Ritter qualified for the 1980 U.S. Olympic team but was unable to compete due to the 1980 Summer Olympics boycott. She did however receive one of 461 Congressional Gold Medals created especially for the spurned athletes.

Louise won the gold medal in the women's high jump at the 1988 Summer Olympics held in Seoul, South Korea.  In doing so she upset Stefka Kostadinova, the reigning world champion and world record-holder in the event.  A graduate from Red Oak High School she now has a street named after her located in her former home town of Red Oak, TX.

She graduated from Texas Woman's University in 1988 where she starred for U.S. Olympic coach Dr. Bert Lyle.

She was Inducted into the Texas Track and Field Coaches Hall of Fame, Class of 2012.

Achievements
 4 Times US National Champion (1978, 1983, 1985, 1986)
 3 Times won US Olympic Trials (1980, 1984, 1988)
Note: During the 1980s, the US Championships and US Olympic trials were separate events.

References

External links
 
 
 
 

1958 births
Living people
American female high jumpers
Athletes (track and field) at the 1984 Summer Olympics
Athletes (track and field) at the 1988 Summer Olympics
Athletes (track and field) at the 1979 Pan American Games
Congressional Gold Medal recipients
Medalists at the 1988 Summer Olympics
Olympic gold medalists for the United States in track and field
Pan American Games gold medalists for the United States
Pan American Games medalists in athletics (track and field)
Sportspeople from Dallas
Track and field athletes from Dallas
Texas Tech Red Raiders track and field coaches
World Athletics Championships medalists
Competitors at the 1986 Goodwill Games
Medalists at the 1979 Pan American Games
21st-century American women